Valeri Aleksandrovich Klimov (born 31 January 1974) is a Russian professional football coach and a former player. He is an assistant coach for FC Fakel Voronezh. Klimov was a midfielder who could play either in the centre or on the wings.

Personal life
His older son Nikita was a footballer before retiring due to injuries, and his younger son Kirill Klimov is also a footballer.

Career statistics

References

External links
  Player page on the official FC Tom Tomsk website
 
  Valeri Klimov at Footballdatabase

1974 births
People from Izmalkovsky District
Living people
Russian footballers
Association football midfielders
Russian expatriate footballers
Expatriate footballers in Kazakhstan
FC Torpedo Moscow players
FC Torpedo-2 players
FC Spartak Vladikavkaz players
FC Moscow players
FC Rubin Kazan players
Russian expatriate sportspeople in Kazakhstan
FC Tom Tomsk players
Russian Premier League players
FC Oryol players
FC Arsenal Tula players
Sportspeople from Lipetsk Oblast